Frank Sobott, Ph.D. (2000), is a German chemist, who is active in the fields of mass spectrometry and biochemistry; he is a professor of the University of Leeds from February 2017. 
He obtained a PhD in physical and theoretical chemistry in 2000 at the Johann Wolfgang Goethe University Frankfurt am Main, under the supervision of professors Bernhard Brutschy and Michael Karas. He was an associate professor of mass spectrometry at the Center for Proteomics of the University of Antwerp, Belgium, from 2009 to 2017.

Works 
 Frank Sobott: Charakterisierung und Anwendung der LILBID-Laserdesorptions-Massenspektrometrie, Thesis/dissertation, Berlin, Frankfurt: Dissertation.de, 2001.

References

Web-sources 
 
 

Living people
Year of birth missing (living people)
British chemists
Academics of the University of Leeds